Dialithis is a monotypic moth genus of the family Erebidae. Its only species, Dialithis gemmifera, is found in America. Both the genus and the species were first described by Jacob Hübner, the genus in 1821 and the species in 1823.

References

Calpinae
Monotypic moth genera